Ravasjan (also Romanized as Ravāsjān) is a village in Azghan Rural District, in the Central District of Ahar County, East Azerbaijan Province, Iran. At the 2006 census, its population was 866, in 203 families.

References 

Populated places in Ahar County